Raleigh Park is a park of about  in North Hinksey, Oxfordshire (formerly in Berkshire), just west of Oxford.
The land was formerly part of the estates of the Harcourt family.  The land was sold in 1924 to Raymond ffennell, then owner of Wytham Abbey, who gave it to the City of Oxford for use as a park.  It was named in honour of Professor Sir Walter Raleigh, who lived nearby on Harcourt Hill and died in 1922.

Although the park lies in the green belt outside the city boundary, it is managed by Oxford City Council as a nature reserve and recreational park. It is on rising ground, giving expansive views over the city of Oxford.

References

External links 
Friends of Raleigh Park

1924 establishments in England
Parks and open spaces in Oxfordshire
Nature reserves in Oxfordshire